Song of the Yellow Bird (Hwangjoga) is the oldest known Korean song and was written by Yuri of Goguryeo in 17 B.C. It was written lamenting the loss of one of his wives who left his household following a quarrel with another of his wives. While Yuri of Goguryeo was away hunting, his second wife, Chihui, who was Han Chinese, was scolded by his first wife, Hwa hui: “How can you be so rude even though you are only a concubine?" Chihui left the household, never to return. Missing her greatly, Yuri of Goguryeo wrote this song.

A Chinese translation of Song of the Yellow Bird is recorded in  the Samguk Sagi.

Song Structure 
One day, Yuri of Goguryeo saw a couple of yellow birds (Oriolus chinensis), and wrote the Song of the Yellow Bird.
{|
! style="width:12em;"|
! style="width:45em;"|
|-
|
 翩翩黃鳥，
 雌雄相依。
 念我之獨，
 誰其與歸? 
|
Orioles fly smoothly
Female and male cuddle close together
Thinking of my loneliness
Whom shall I go with?
|}

References

External links

Korean literature
Korean music
Chinese-language literature of Korea